Seward Airport  is a state-owned, public-use airport located two nautical miles (2.3 miles; 3.7 km) northeast of the central business district of Seward, a city in Kenai Peninsula Borough of the U.S. state of Alaska. This airport is included in the FAA's National Plan of Integrated Airport Systems for 2011–2015, which categorized it as a general aviation facility.

History
The airport was built during World War II. It was named Walseth Air Force Base in honor of Major Marvin E. Walseth, a United States Army Air Forces pilot who died when his aircraft crashed on Umnak in July 1942 while returning from a reconnaissance mission over Kiska. It was closed by the United States Air Force in April 1947. It was excessed to the War Assets Administration and taken over by the Territory of Alaska.

The airport previously had scheduled passenger service to Anchorage (ANC) provided by several commuter air carriers over the years but does not have airline flights at the present time.

Facilities and aircraft 
It has two asphalt paved runways: 13/31 is 4,240 by 100 feet (1,292 x 30 m) and 16/34 is 2,279 by 75 feet (695 x 23 m).

For the 12-month period ending December 31, 2009, the airport had 10,510 aircraft operations, an average of 28 per day: 57% general aviation, 43% air taxi, and <1% military. At that time there were 25 single-engine aircraft based at this airport.

See also 
 Alaska World War II Army Airfields

References

External links 
 

Airfields of the United States Army Air Forces in Alaska
Airports in Kenai Peninsula Borough, Alaska
Buildings and structures in Seward, Alaska